The United States Guards were a formation of the National Army created to guard strategic installations and areas in order to free infantry regiments for war service in the First World War.

American Civil War
During the Civil War Colonel H.P. Montgomery offered to recruit a regiment in New York with the title of "United States Guards" but his offer was not accepted.

World War I

The Guards were created on 22 December 1917 and were controlled by the Chief of the Militia Bureau. They eventually comprised 48 battalions of men who were either too old or physically unfit for active service.

The Guards were disbanded following the end of the war in 1920. The experience led the US Army to not wish to bear the financial burden of paying for troops whose only use was internal security.

World War II

The idea of reforming the US Guards was discussed in 1941 with the National Guard Bureau replying that the War Department did not want Federal troops for internal security duties; this function would be performed by state guards.

References
National Guard Bureau Military Protection, United States Guards: The Use of Organized Bodies in the Protection and Defense of Property During Riots, Strikes, and Civil Disturbances 1919
United States.

Notes

See also
 Veteran Reserve Corps
 State defense force

Military units and formations of the United States in World War I
History of the United States Army
Military units and formations established in 1917